Can't Hide Love is a 1976 album by Carmen McRae, this was her third and last album to be released on Blue Note Records.

Reception

In his review of the album for Allmusic, Scott Yanow described it as "...the type of session that killed Blue Note the first time around." adding that McRae "gamely tries to interpret unsuitable and inferior pop tunes ("The Man I Love" and "A Child Is Born" are the only exceptions) and is backed by an all-star but faceless orchestra that is given nothing to do. ...The trumpet section...is not given a single solo. The title cut is quite ludicrous and songs such as "Only Women Bleed" and "I Wish You Well" do not fit McRae's style at all."

Track listing
 "Can't Hide Love" (Skip Scarborough) - 3:53
 "The Man I Love" (George Gershwin, Ira Gershwin) - 4:14
 "Only Women Bleed" (Alice Cooper, Dick Wagner) - 4:58
 "I Wish You Well" (Bill Withers) - 3:16
 "All by Myself" (Eric Carmen) - 6:00
 "Music" (James Taylor) - 3:29
 "Lost Up in Loving You" (Kenny Rankin, Yvonne Rankin, Will Smith) - 4:37
 "You're Everything" (Chick Corea, Neville Potter) - 2:48
 "Would You Believe?" (Randy California, Cy Coleman, James Lipton) - 4:07
 "A Child Is Born" (Thad Jones) - 3:24

Personnel
Carmen McRae - vocals
Don Menza, Jerome Richardson - saxophone
Blue Mitchell, Bobby Shew - trumpet
David Frisina, Gerald Vinci - violin
Artie Kane - piano
Marshall Otwell - keyboards, piano, electric piano
Dave Grusin, Joe Sample - keyboards
Ian Underwood - synthesizer
Dennis Budimir, Larry Carlton - guitar
Chuck Berghofer, Joe Mondragon - double bass
Wilton Felder - bass guitar
Harvey Mason - drums
Larry Bunker, Victor Feldman - percussion
Lanny Morgan, Bill Green, Harry Klee, Abe Most, Bill Perkins, Pete Christlieb, Jack Nimitz, Ernie Watts - saxophone
Al Aarons, Oscar Brashear, Buddy Childers, Snooky Young - trumpet
George Bohanon, Lew McCreary , Grover Mitchell, Kenny Shroyer, Maurice Spears, Ernie Tack - trombone
Guildhall String Ensemble - strings
Production
Dale Oehler - producer
Hank Cicalo - engineer

References

1976 albums
Blue Note Records albums
Carmen McRae albums